Monte Carmo is a mountain in the Ligurian Apennine, northern Italy.

Geography 
The mountain is located at the boundary between the three regions of Liguria, Piedmont and Emilia-Romagna. Nearby are the Val Borbera, Val Trebbia, Val Boreca and Valle Terenzone valleys. 
Its summit is a tripoint at which the borders of the regions of Piedmont, Emilia-Romagna and Liguria meet.

Hiking 
Monte Carmo was crossed by the so-called "Lombard Salt Road", which from Pavia led to Torriglia and then to Genoa.

References

External links
 Page at summitpost.org

Mountains of Emilia-Romagna
Mountains of Liguria
Mountains of Piedmont
Mountains of the Apennines
One-thousanders of Italy